Events in the year 2018 in Sudan.

Incumbents 
 President: Omar al-Bashir
 Prime Minister: Bakri Hassan Saleh
 Vice President: Bakri Hassan Saleh (first), Hassabu Mohamed Abdalrahman (second)

Events
War in Darfur continues.

Sport
3 February – Football: season start of the 2018 Sudan Premier League

Deaths

 5 January – Vincent Mojwok Nyiker, Roman Catholic prelate, Bishop of Malakal (b. 1933).

 July – Fatima Abdel Mahmoud, politician (b. 1945).

18 October – Abdel Rahman Swar al-Dahab, military officer and politician, President 1985–1986 (born 1934).

References

 
2010s in Sudan 
Years of the 21st century in Sudan 
Sudan 
Sudan